Mashal Khan is a Pakistani television personality who gained popularity by playing the role of "Kinza" in the serial which proved to be the breakthrough for her. In 2019, she appeared in Suno Chanda 2, a sequel to Suno Chanda and reprise her role of Kinza. She further appeared as antagonist in Mere Humdam and as Sonia in Khaas. She also appeared as host in travel guide show Amazing Nordics at Hum TV.

Career
Khan also appeared in Hum TV Drama Dulhan as Annie.

Personal life
Khan was engaged to actor Ali Ansari since 2017. Later, in 2020, their relationship suddenly ended.

Filmography

Television series

Telefilm

Film

Web series

References

External links
 
 
 
 

1997 births
Living people
Pakistani television actresses
21st-century Pakistani actresses
Pakistani film actresses